Petrang Kabayo is a 2010 Filipino fantasy comedy-drama film produced and released by Viva Films. The film was directed by Manola Ayala and stars comedian Vice Ganda in his first lead role. It is a remake of Petrang Kabayo at ang Pilyang Kuting (1988).

Although receiving mixed reviews from critics, the film was a box office success earning  in its theatrical run.

Plot
Peter Kasimsiman is a homosexual who is adopted by a wealthy lady, Doña Biday, after being abused by his father for his orientation. But he becomes abusive of his newfound wealth, and becomes more so, after the death of Doña Biday, leading him to mistreat his servants, employees, friends and even the property's horses. After the death of one of Peter's horses from overwork, Diobayo, the goddess of horses, gives Peter a curse that transforms him into a horse every time he gets angry or does bad things. During his horse phase, he is taken in by his former employee Erickson, who names him Petra and uses him to drive his calesa, only reverting to human form when he performs a good deed. After mending his ways and reconciling with his now repentant father, he voluntarily asks Diobayo to become a horse again to win a race that keeps his estate from falling into bankruptcy. Erickson, in a fit of excitement, kisses Petra, who becomes Peter in front of him, to his embarrassment.

Cast and characters

Main cast
Vice Ganda as Peter/ Petra (voice)

Supporting cast
Luis Manzano as Erickson Santos
Abby Bautista as Pauline
Gloria Romero as Lola Idang
Sam Pinto as Samantha
Candy Pangilinan as Maita
Eagle Riggs as Diobayo
DJ Durano as Dickson Santos

Recurring cast
Joy Viado† as Lina 
Tom Rodriguez as Chito
John Arcilla as Poldo
Ricky Rivero as Geronino 
Celine Lim as Anna

Special participation
Anne Curtis as Kalesa Passenger
Eugene Domingo as Doña Biday
Gladys Reyes as Pregnant Kalesa Passenger
John Lapus as Filipino/Chinese Matron Judy Ann Santos 
Dennis Padilla as Marjoroi 
Makisig Morales as Young Peter/Pedro 
Jason Francisco as Waiter 
Nadine Lustre as Dina Helena

Home video release
Petrang Kabayo was released on DVD and VCD on December 15, 2010, by Viva Video.

References

External links 
 

2010 LGBT-related films
2010 films
Viva Films films
Films about horses
Films about shapeshifting
Films directed by Wenn V. Deramas
LGBT-related comedy films
Philippine fantasy comedy films
Remakes of Philippine films
Philippine LGBT-related films
Philippine supernatural films
Supernatural comedy films
Gay-related films